This is a list of the busiest airports in Romania.

Passenger traffic chart

2022

2021

2020

2019

2018

2017

2016

2015

Notes:
A.Airport operating authority figures.
B.INSSE figures.

2014

2013

2012

2011

2010

2009

2008

See also
 Aviation in Romania
 List of airports in Romania
 List of the busiest airports in Europe
 Wikipedia:WikiProject Aviation/Airline destination lists: Europe#Romania

References

 
Ro